David Hastings Moore (September 4, 1838 – November 23, 1915) was an American  bishop of the Methodist Episcopal Church, elected in 1900.  He also gained notability as a Union Army officer in the American Civil War, as a pastor, as the editor of an important Methodist periodical, and as a university chancellor.

Birth and early life
David was born September 4, 1838, in Athens, Ohio, a son of the Hon. Eliakim Hastings Moore, a U.S. Congressman.  David was converted to the Christian faith in 1855.

David married Julia Sophia Carpenter, also of Athens, June 21, 1860.  She died in 1911, leaving the couple's six children.

Education and military service
David graduated from the Ohio University in 1860 with the A.B. degree.  He earned the A.M. degree from O.U. in 1863.  He also was awarded the honorary degrees D.D. and LL.D.

In May 1862 David volunteered as a chaplain  in the Union Army during the American Civil War, becoming a captain commanding an Ohio Company at Harper's Ferry when General Miles surrendered that post.  Released on parole, he was soon exchanged and re-entered the service as a major, then was promoted to lieutenant-colonel.  He had command of the 125th Ohio Infantry (a regiment dubbed the "Ohio Tigers" by General Thomas of Chickamauga) for almost the entire Atlanta Campaign, his colonel having been placed in command of a brigade.  Having been wounded, after the fall of Atlanta, his health being impaired, he returned to civilian life in Ohio, where he was immediately re-employed as a pastor.

Ordained and academic ministries
David entered the ordained ministry of the M.E. Church in 1860, admitted as a probationer in the Ohio Annual Conference.  His pastoral ministry actually began in 1855, when he was appointed pastor of the Second Street M.E. Church in Zanesville, Ohio (serving there until 1868, before and after military service).  Moore subsequently served these appointments:  St. Paul's M.E. in Delaware, Ohio (1868–70); Wesley Chapel in Columbus, Ohio (1870–72); and Trinity M.E. in Cincinnati (1872–75), having transferred his conference membership to the Cincinnati Annual Conference in 1872.

Moore became the president of the Cincinnati Wesleyan Female Seminary (aka Cincinnati Wesleyan College) in 1875, serving until 1880.  He then followed fellow Athens, Ohio-born Methodist Earl Cranston to Colorado, where he became the president of the Colorado Seminary.  As such Moore also became the first chancellor of the University of Denver (which the Colorado Seminary became), which he organized under favorable auspices, serving in this capacity from October 1880 to June 1889. He also served as the pastor of Evans Memorial Chapel at this time, assigned to this role in 1883.

It is said that "his labors [at the University of Denver] are among the treasures of the Rocky Mountain Conference traditions."  He had a genius for friendship which provided a way into the hearts of the plainsmen and mountaineers of that day.  This made him and the young university he served a power.  Indeed, Bishop Harmon writes:

He rode the buckboards and stages, bumping through canyons of Colorado and Wyoming, a builder of a civilization of strong western men.

Editorial ministry
Moore became the Editor of the Western Christian Advocate, an important Methodist publication of the day, in 1889.  His editorials rang clear and strong as he championed the rights of women (regarding membership in General Conference, which they were denied at that time) and the rights of the "Freedmen" (both in the church and outside of it).  Indeed, as it has been said, "there was never a dull line where David Moore's pen had wrought."  Moore held this position until elected Bishop.

Episcopal ministry
Moore was made a bishop by the 1900 General Conference of the M.E. Church.  He was initially assigned as Bishop of China, Japan and Korea, serving there four years.  This was at the time of the Boxer uprising.  Moore also wrote a vivid description of the war between Japan and Russia during this time.

Following his four years service in the Far East, Moore was assigned successively to Portland, Oregon (1904–08), and Cincinnati, Ohio (1908–12).  He retired at the 1912 General Conference.

In 1915 Moore wrote a biography of his friend, fellow-Ohioan and Bishop John Morgan Walden.

Death and burial
Moore died November 23, 1915, on a train going to Cincinnati, Ohio.  His body was laid to rest in a quiet churchyard in Athens, Ohio.

Life summation
Jesse A. Earl, in his article about Bishop Moore in the Encyclopedia of World Methodism, wrote this about him:

"A man of great strength of character, David Hastings Moore had a vivid imagination, a rich and copious vocabulary, and an analytic and synthetic mind.  He was an example of outspoken loyalty to his principles, his friends and his fellowmen around the world."

Selected writings
Introduction, Echoes from Peak and Plain, I.H. Beardsley, 1898.
Tribute to Elizabeth Walden, pamphlet, 1900.
Introduction, Life of Emily J., by Thomas Harwood, 1903.
Address:  The Open Door in Eastern Asia, First General Missionary Convention, Cleveland, 1903.
John Morgan Walden, 35th bishop, 1915.
Bishop Moore also wrote a description of the Russo-Japanese War.  He witnessed this event while in charge of missions in China, Japan and Korea.

Biography
Sketch in Echoes from Peak and Plain, I.H. Beardsley, 1898.

See also

List of bishops of the United Methodist Church

References

Leete, Frederick DeLand, Methodist Bishops.  Nashville, The Methodist Publishing House, 1948.
Methodism:  Ohio Area (1812–1962), edited by John M. Versteeg, Litt.D., D.D. (Ohio Area Sesquicentennial Committee, 1962).
 Cyclopaedia of Methodism, Matthew Simpson, D.D., LL.D., Ed., (Revised Edition.)  Philadelphia, Louis H. Everts, 1880. 
 Encyclopedia of World Methodism, Nolan Bailey Harmon, General Editor. Nashville:  United Methodist Publishing House, 1974, p. 1664.

External links
Chancellors of the University of Denver 

1838 births
1915 deaths
American Methodist bishops
Bishops of the Methodist Episcopal Church
Union Army officers
Editors of Christian publications
People from Athens, Ohio
Chancellors of the University of Denver
American biographers
American expatriates in China
American expatriates in Japan